The 2011 Nigerian Senate election in Borno State was held on April 9, 2011, to elect members of the Nigerian Senate to represent Borno State. Ahmed Zanna representing Borno Central and Mohammed Ali Ndume representing Borno South won on the platform of Peoples Democratic Party, while Maina Maaji Lawan representing Borno North won on the platform of All Nigeria Peoples Party.

Overview

Summary

Results

Borno Central 
Peoples Democratic Party candidate Ahmed Zanna won the election, defeating other party candidates.

Borno South 
Peoples Democratic Party candidate Mohammed Ali Ndume won the election, defeating other party candidates.

Borno North 
All Nigeria Peoples Party candidate Maina Maaji Lawan won the election, defeating other party candidates.

References 

Borno State senatorial elections
Borno State senatorial elections
Borno State Senate elections